Donald Armond Dietrich (April 5, 1961 – February 16, 2021) was a Canadian ice hockey defenceman who played 28 games in the National Hockey League with the Chicago Black Hawks and New Jersey Devils between 1983 and 1986,. He was selected 183rd overall by the Chicago Black Hawks in the 1980 NHL Entry Draft. He joined the Hawks for 17 games in 1983–84, recording five assists, but spent most of his time in the Chicago organization in the minor leagues. He was traded to the New Jersey Devils in 1985 along with Rich Preston for Bob MacMillan. He appeared in 11 games with the Devils in 1985–86 before spending four years playing in West Germany.  He retired in 1991.

Dietrich was born in Deloraine, Manitoba. Dietrich died in 2021 at the age of 59, he had Parkinson's disease and cancer in his later years.

Career statistics

Regular season and playoffs

References

External links

1961 births
2021 deaths
Brandon Wheat Kings players
Canadian expatriate ice hockey players in Germany
Canadian ice hockey defencemen
Chicago Blackhawks draft picks
Chicago Blackhawks players
Hershey Bears players
Ice hockey people from Manitoba
Milwaukee Admirals (IHL) players
New Brunswick Hawks players
New Jersey Devils players
People from Deloraine, Manitoba
Roanoke Valley Rebels players
SC Lyss players
Schwenninger Wild Wings players
Springfield Indians players